ODIN was a submarine telecommunications cable system linking the Netherlands, Denmark, Norway, and Sweden.

It was 1040 km in length and used Synchronous Digital Hierarchy technology and had two 2.5Gbit/s lines (One active and one redundant) and can simultaneously carry 30,000 telephone calls. It was built in 3 segments (Segment 1: Netherlands - Denmark, segment 2: Denmark - Norway, Segment 3: Norway - Sweden) and the project cost DKK 480m (Approx. €64.5m).

It had landing points in:

 Alkmaar, Netherlands
 Måde, Denmark
 Blåbjerg, Denmark
 Kristiansand, Norway
 Lysekil, Sweden

The segment between Måde and Blåbjerg was overland (shown in blue).

ODIN Seg1 is out of service since 1 January 2007.

Segment 3 is out of service since approximately 22 April 2008.

The last segment was taken out of service before January 2009.

References

External links
  

Submarine communications cables in the North Sea
2007 disestablishments in the Netherlands
2008 disestablishments in Sweden
2009 disestablishments in Denmark
2009 disestablishments in Norway